Clavulina kunmudlutsa is a species of coral fungus in the family Clavulinaceae. It is known only from Guyana. The specific epithet kunmudlutsa is the vernacular name applied to this fungus by the Patamona people, who collect it as an edible species.

References

External links

Edible fungi
Fungi described in 2010
Fungi of Guyana
kunmudlutsa